Carl Brandt may refer to:

 Carl Brandt (composer) (1914–1991), American composer and arranger, prolific with TV studios, film, and recording artists
 Carl Ludwig Brandt (1831–1905), German-born artist who worked mostly in the United States
 Charlie Brandt (1957–2004), American serial killer

See also 
Karl Brandt (disambiguation)

 Brandt (surname)